The Triple Crown of Acting is a term used in the American entertainment industry to describe actors who have won a competitive Academy Award, Emmy Award, and Tony Award in the acting categories, the highest accolades recognized in American film, television, and theater, respectively. The term is related to other competitive areas, such as the Triple Crown of horse racing.

Only 24 people, 15 women and nine men, have achieved the Triple Crown.

Helen Hayes became the first actor to do so with her Emmy Award on February 5, 1953. Less than two months later, Thomas Mitchell became the first man to do so when he received a Tony Award on March 29, 1953. Hayes, Rita Moreno, and Viola Davis are the only Triple Crown winners in competitive acting categories who have also won a Grammy Award to complete the EGOT (Emmy, Grammy, Oscar, Tony).

Living winners of the Triple Crown of Acting are Rita Moreno, Jeremy Irons, Vanessa Redgrave, Maggie Smith, Helen Mirren, Al Pacino, Frances McDormand, Jessica Lange, Geoffrey Rush, Ellen Burstyn, Glenda Jackson and Viola Davis.

The British entertainment industry  which has long links with its American counterpart through shared language and frequent cross-Atlantic production, also has a Triple Crown of its own, consisting of the BAFTA Film Awards, the BAFTA Television Awards and the Laurence Olivier Awards. The eight actors who have completed the British Triple Crown in competitive acting categories are Judi Dench, Virginia McKenna, Peggy Ashcroft, Nigel Hawthorne, Albert Finney, Julie Walters, Helen Mirren, and Mark Rylance. 

Only Helen Mirren has earned both the American and British Triple Crowns.

Summary

Triple Crown winners
Years given are the years of the respective ceremonies. Performers are listed in order of completing the Triple Crown.

Helen Hayes

American actress Helen Hayes (1900–1993) was the first performer to achieve the triple crown of acting, doing so in 1953. Hayes was a 9-time Emmy (1), 3-time Tony (2), and 2-time Oscar (2) nominee, for a total of 14 TC nominations. She won two Oscars, two Tonys and an Emmy for a total of five competitive triple crown awards. She also won a Grammy in 1977 for Best Spoken Word Recording to complete the EGOT, for competitive Emmy, Grammy, Oscar and Tony wins. Hayes is one of only three Triple Crown winners (along with Rita Moreno and Viola Davis) to have achieved the EGOT.

 1932: Academy Award for Best Actress – The Sin of Madelon Claudet
 1947: Tony Award for Best Actress in a Play – Happy Birthday
 1953: Primetime Emmy Award for Best Actress 
 1958: Tony Award for Best Actress in a Play – Time Remembered
 1971: Academy Award for Best Supporting Actress – Airport

Thomas Mitchell

American actor and writer Thomas Mitchell (1892–1962) completed the triple crown in 1953, two months after Helen Hayes. He was a 3-time Emmy (1), 2-time Oscar (1), and 1-time Tony (1) nominee, for a total of six TC nominations. Mitchell won three awards.

 1940: Academy Award for Best Supporting Actor – Stagecoach
 1953: Primetime Emmy Award for Best Actor
 1953: Tony Award for Best Actor in a Musical – Hazel Flagg

Ingrid Bergman

Swedish actress Ingrid Bergman (1915–1982) completed the triple crown in 1960. She was a 7-time Oscar (3), 3-time Emmy (2), and 1-time Tony (1) nominee, for a total of 11 TC nominations. Bergman won six awards.

 1945: Academy Award for Best Actress – Gaslight
 1947: Tony Award for Best Actress in a Play – Joan of Lorraine
 1958: Academy Award for Best Actress – Anastasia
 1960: Primetime Emmy Award for Outstanding Single Performance by an Actress – Startime - The Turn of the Screw
 1975: Academy Award for Best Supporting Actress – Murder on the Orient Express
 1982: Primetime Emmy Award for Outstanding Lead Actress in a Miniseries or a Movie – A Woman Called Golda

Shirley Booth

American actress Shirley Booth (1898–1992) completed the triple crown in 1962. She was a 4-time Emmy (2), 3-time Tony (3), and 1-time Oscar (1) nominee, for a total of eight TC nominations. Booth won six awards.

 1949: Tony Award for Best Featured Actress in a Play – Goodbye, My Fancy
 1950: Tony Award for Best Actress in a Play – Come Back, Little Sheba
 1953: Academy Award for Best Actress – Come Back, Little Sheba
 1953: Tony Award for Best Actress in a Play – The Time of the Cuckoo
 1962: Primetime Emmy Award for Outstanding Lead Actress in a Comedy Series – Hazel
 1963: Primetime Emmy Award for Outstanding Lead Actress in a Comedy Series – Hazel

Melvyn Douglas

American actor Melvyn Douglas (1901–1981) completed the triple crown in 1968. He was a 3-time Oscar (2), 2-time Emmy (1), and 1-time Tony (1) nominee, for a total of six TC nominations. Douglas won four awards.

 1960: Tony Award for Best Actor in a Play – The Best Man
 1964: Academy Award for Best Supporting Actor – Hud
 1968: Primetime Emmy Award for Outstanding Lead Actor in a Miniseries or a Movie – CBS Playhouse - Do Not Go Gentle Into That Good Night
 1979: Academy Award for Best Supporting Actor – Being There

Paul Scofield

English actor Paul Scofield (1922–2008) completed the triple crown in 1969. He was a 2-time Oscar (1), 1-time Emmy (1), and 1-time Tony (1) nominee, for a total of four TC nominations. Scofield won three awards. His seven-year completion is the fastest of any triple crown recipient.

 1962: Tony Award for Best Actor in a Play – A Man for All Seasons
 1967: Academy Award for Best Actor – A Man for All Seasons
 1969: Primetime Emmy Award for Outstanding Lead Actor in a Miniseries or a Movie – Male of the Species

Jack Albertson

American actor, comedian, dancer and singer Jack Albertson (1907–1981) completed the triple crown in 1975. He was a 5-time Emmy (2), 2-time Tony (1), and 1-time Oscar (1) nominee, for a total of eight TC nominations. Albertson won four awards.

 1965: Tony Award for Best Featured Actor in a Play – The Subject Was Roses
 1969: Academy Award for Best Supporting Actor – The Subject Was Roses
 1975: Primetime Emmy Award for Outstanding Continuing or Single Performance by a Supporting Actor in Variety or Music – Cher
 1976: Primetime Emmy Award for Outstanding Lead Actor in a Comedy Series – Chico and the Man

Rita Moreno

Puerto Rican actress, dancer, and singer Rita Moreno (born 1931) completed the triple crown in 1977. She is a 6-time Emmy (2), 1-time Oscar (1), and 1-time Tony (1) nominee, for a total of eight TC nominations. Her Emmy win saw her complete the EGOT for competitive Emmy, Grammy, Oscar and Tony wins. Her Grammy win was in 1972 in the Best Recording for Children category. Moreno is the first Hispanic actor to win the Triple Crown and is one of only three Triple Crown winners who have also achieved the EGOT.

 1962: Academy Award for Best Supporting Actress – West Side Story
 1975: Tony Award for Best Featured Actress in a Play – The Ritz
 1977: Primetime Emmy Award for Outstanding Continuing or Single Performance by a Supporting Actress in Variety or Music – The Muppet Show
 1978: Primetime Emmy Award for Outstanding Lead Actress for a Single Appearance in a Comedy or Drama Series – The Rockford Files

Maureen Stapleton

American actress Maureen Stapleton (1925–2006) completed the triple crown in 1982. She was a 7-time Emmy (1), 6-time Tony (2), and 4-time Oscar (1) nominee, for a total of 17 nominations. Stapleton won four awards.

 1951: Tony Award for Best Featured Actress in a Play – The Rose Tattoo
 1967: Primetime Emmy Award for Outstanding Lead Actress in a Miniseries or a Movie – Among the Paths to Eden
 1971: Tony Award for Best Actress in a Play – The Gingerbread Lady
 1982: Academy Award for Best Supporting Actress – Reds

Jason Robards

American actor Jason Robards (1922–2000) completed the triple crown in 1988. He was an 8-time Tony (1), 5-time Emmy (1), and 3-time Oscar (2) nominee, for a total of 16 TC nominations. Robards won four awards.

 1959: Tony Award for Best Actor in a Play – The Disenchanted
 1977: Academy Award for Best Supporting Actor – All the President's Men
 1978: Academy Award for Best Supporting Actor – Julia
 1988: Primetime Emmy Award for Outstanding Lead Actor in a Miniseries or a Movie – Inherit the Wind

Jessica Tandy

British-American actress Jessica Tandy (1909–1994) completed the triple crown in 1990. She was a 5-time Tony (3), 3-time Emmy (1), and 2-time Oscar nominee (1), for a total of 10 TC nominations. Tandy won five awards.

 1947: Tony Award for Best Actress in a Play – A Streetcar Named Desire
 1978: Tony Award for Best Actress in a Play – The Gin Game
 1983: Tony Award for Best Actress in a Play – Foxfire
 1988: Primetime Emmy Award for Outstanding Lead Actress in a Miniseries or a Movie – Foxfire
 1990: Academy Award for Best Actress – Driving Miss Daisy

Jeremy Irons

English actor and activist Jeremy Irons (born 1948) completed the triple crown in 1997. He is a 3-time acting Emmy (2), 1-time Oscar (1), and 1-time Tony (1) nominee, for a total of five TC nominations. Irons has won four TC awards.

 1984: Tony Award for Best Actor in a Play – The Real Thing
 1991: Academy Award for Best Actor – Reversal of Fortune
 1997: Primetime Emmy Award for Outstanding Voice-Over Performance – The Great War and the Shaping of the 20th Century
 2006: Primetime Emmy Award for Outstanding Supporting Actor in a Miniseries or a Movie – Elizabeth I

Note: Irons has an additional Emmy win in a non-acting category, winning the Primetime Emmy Award for Outstanding Narrator in 2014 for Game of Lions.

Anne Bancroft

American actress Anne Bancroft (1931–2005) completed the triple crown in 1999. She was a 6-time (1) acting Emmy, 5-time Oscar (1), and 3-time Tony (2) nominee, for a total of 14 TC nominations. Bancroft won four triple crown awards.

 1958: Tony Award for Best Featured Actress in a Play – Two for the Seesaw
 1960: Tony Award for Best Actress in a Play – The Miracle Worker
 1963: Academy Award for Best Actress – The Miracle Worker
 1999: Primetime Emmy Award for Outstanding Supporting Actress in a Miniseries or a Movie – Deep in My Heart

Note: Bancroft won an additional Emmy in 1970 in the variety program category, as the star of the special Annie, the Women in the Life of a Man.

Vanessa Redgrave

English actress and activist Vanessa Redgrave (born 1937) completed the triple crown in 2003. She is a 6-time Oscar (1), 6-time Emmy (2), and 3-time Tony (1) nominee, for a total of 15 TC nominations. Redgrave has won four awards.

 1978: Academy Award for Best Supporting Actress – Julia
 1981: Primetime Emmy Award for Outstanding Lead Actress in a Miniseries or a Movie – Playing for Time
 2000: Primetime Emmy Award for Outstanding Supporting Actress in a Miniseries or a Movie – If These Walls Could Talk 2
 2003: Tony Award for Best Actress in a Play – Long Day's Journey into Night

Maggie Smith

English actress Maggie Smith (born 1934) completed the triple crown in 2003. She is a 9-time Emmy (4), 6-time Oscar (2), and 3-time Tony (1) nominee, for a total of 18 TC nominations. Smith is the first and only Triple Crown winner to win seven awards.

 1970: Academy Award for Best Actress – The Prime of Miss Jean Brodie
 1979: Academy Award for Best Supporting Actress – California Suite
 1990: Tony Award for Best Actress in a Play – Lettice and Lovage
 2003: Primetime Emmy Award for Outstanding Lead Actress in a Miniseries or a Movie – My House in Umbria
 2011: Primetime Emmy Award for Outstanding Supporting Actress in a Miniseries or a Movie – Downton Abbey
 2012: Primetime Emmy Award for Outstanding Supporting Actress in a Drama Series – Downton Abbey
 2016: Primetime Emmy Award for Outstanding Supporting Actress in a Drama Series – Downton Abbey

Al Pacino

American actor Al Pacino (born 1940) completed the triple crown in 2004. He is a 9-time Oscar (1), 3-time Emmy (2), and 3-time Tony (2) nominee, for a total of 15 TC nominations. Pacino has won five awards.

 1969: Tony Award for Best Featured Actor in a Play – Does a Tiger Wear a Necktie?
 1977: Tony Award for Best Actor in a Play – The Basic Training of Pavlo Hummel
 1993: Academy Award for Best Actor – Scent of a Woman
 2004: Primetime Emmy Award for Outstanding Lead Actor in a Miniseries or a Movie – Angels in America
 2011: Primetime Emmy Award for Outstanding Lead Actor in a Miniseries or a Movie – You Don't Know Jack

Geoffrey Rush

Australian actor Geoffrey Rush (born 1951) completed the triple crown in 2009. He is a 4-time Oscar (1), 2-time Emmy (1), and 1-time Tony (1) nominee, for a total of seven TC nominations. Rush has won three awards.

 1997: Academy Award for Best Actor – Shine
 2005: Primetime Emmy Award for Outstanding Lead Actor in a Miniseries or a Movie – The Life and Death of Peter Sellers
 2009: Tony Award for Best Actor in a Play – Exit the King

Ellen Burstyn

American actress Ellen Burstyn (born 1932) completed the triple crown in 2009. She is an 8-time Emmy (2), 6-time Oscar (1), and 1-time Tony (1) nominee, for a total of 15 TC nominations. Burstyn has won four awards.

 1975: Academy Award for Best Actress – Alice Doesn't Live Here Anymore
 1975: Tony Award for Best Actress in a Play – Same Time, Next Year
 2009: Primetime Emmy Award for Outstanding Guest Actress in a Drama Series – Law and Order: Special Victims Unit
 2013: Primetime Emmy Award for Outstanding Supporting Actress in a Miniseries or a Movie – Political Animals

Christopher Plummer

Canadian actor Christopher Plummer (1929–2021) completed the triple crown in 2012. He was a 7-time Emmy (2), 7-time Tony (2), and 3-time Oscar (1) nominee, for a total of 17 TC nominations. Plummer won five awards.

 1974: Tony Award for Best Actor in a Musical – Cyrano
 1977: Primetime Emmy Award for Outstanding Lead Actor in a Miniseries or a Movie – The Moneychangers
 1994: Primetime Emmy Award for Outstanding Voice-Over Performance – Madeline
 1997: Tony Award for Best Actor in a Play – Barrymore
 2012: Academy Award for Best Supporting Actor – Beginners

Helen Mirren

English actor Helen Mirren (born 1945) completed the triple crown in 2015. She is an 11-time Emmy (4), 4-time Oscar (1), and 3-time Tony (1) nominee, for a total of 18 TC nominations. Mirren has won six awards.

 1996: Primetime Emmy Award for Outstanding Lead Actress in a Miniseries or a Movie – Prime Suspect: The Scent of Darkness
 1999: Primetime Emmy Award for Outstanding Lead Actress in a Miniseries or a Movie – The Passion of Ayn Rand
 2006: Primetime Emmy Award for Outstanding Lead Actress in a  Miniseries or a Movie – Elizabeth I
 2007: Academy Award for Best Actress – The Queen
 2007: Primetime Emmy Award for Outstanding Lead Actress in a Miniseries or a Movie – Prime Suspect: The Final Act
 2015: Tony Award for Best Actress in a Play – The Audience

Helen Mirren is the only person to have also won the British Triple Crown of Acting by being awarded the three equivalent honours in the British entertainment industry: a BAFTA Film Award, a BAFTA Television Award and a Laurence Olivier Award.

Note: Mirren has an additional Emmy win in a non-acting category, winning the Children's and Family Emmy Award for Outstanding Host in 2022 for Harry Potter: Hogwarts Tournament of Houses.

Frances McDormand

American actress and producer Frances McDormand (born 1957) completed the triple crown in 2015. She is a 6-time acting Oscar (3), 2-time Tony (1), and 2-time acting Emmy (1) nominee, for a total of 10 TC nominations. McDormand has won five awards.

 1997: Academy Award for Best Actress – Fargo
 2011: Tony Award for Best Actress in a Play – Good People
 2015: Primetime Emmy Award for Outstanding Lead Actress in a Miniseries or a Movie – Olive Kitteridge
 2018: Academy Award for Best Actress – Three Billboards Outside Ebbing, Missouri
 2021: Academy Award for Best Actress – Nomadland

Note: McDormand has two additional Emmy and Oscar wins in non-acting categories, winning the Primetime Emmy Award for Outstanding Limited Series for executive producing Olive Kitteridge, and the Academy Award for Best Picture for producing Nomadland.

Jessica Lange

American actress Jessica Lange (born 1949) completed the triple crown in 2016. She is a 10-time Emmy (3), 6-time Oscar (2), and 1-time Tony (1) nominee, for a total of 17 TC nominations. Lange has won six awards.

 1983: Academy Award for Best Supporting Actress – Tootsie
 1995: Academy Award for Best Actress – Blue Sky
 2009: Primetime Emmy Award for Outstanding Lead Actress in a Miniseries or a Movie – Grey Gardens
 2012: Primetime Emmy Award for Outstanding Supporting Actress in a Miniseries or a Movie – American Horror Story: Murder House
 2014: Primetime Emmy Award for Outstanding Lead Actress in a Miniseries or a Movie – American Horror Story: Coven
 2016: Tony Award for Best Actress in a Play – Long Day's Journey into Night

Viola Davis

American actress and producer Viola Davis (born 1965) completed the triple crown in 2017. She is the first African American person to win the triple crown, and is also currently the youngest. She is a 4-time Oscar (1), 3-time Tony (2), and 5-time Emmy (1) nominee, for a total of 12 TC nominations. Davis has won four awards. Davis is also one of only three Triple Crown winners who have also achieved the EGOT, winning the Grammy Award for Best Audio Book, Narration & Storytelling Recording in 2023.

 2001: Tony Award for Best Featured Actress in a Play – King Hedley II
 2010: Tony Award for Best Actress in a Play – Fences
 2015: Primetime Emmy Award for Outstanding Lead Actress in a Drama Series – How to Get Away with Murder
 2017: Academy Award for Best Supporting Actress – Fences

Glenda Jackson

English actress and former Member of Parliament (MP) Glenda Jackson (born 1936) completed the triple crown in 2018. She is a 5-time Tony (1), 5-time Emmy (3), and 4-time Oscar (2) nominee, for a total of 14 TC nominations. Jackson has won six awards. Her forty-eight-year completion is the longest of any triple crown recipient.

 1971: Academy Award for Best Actress – Women in Love
 1972: Primetime Emmy Award for Outstanding Single Performance by an Actress in a Leading Role – Elizabeth R
 1972: Primetime Emmy Award for Outstanding Continued Performance by an Actress in a Leading Role in a Dramatic Series – Elizabeth R
 1974: Academy Award for Best Actress – A Touch of Class
 2018: Tony Award for Best Actress in a Play – Three Tall Women
 2020: International Emmy Award for Best Actress – Elizabeth Is Missing

Two competitive awards
The following people have each won two out of the three major entertainment awards that honour acting in competitive categories.

Missing an Emmy Award

 Alan Arkin◊
 Martin Balsam†,◊
 Ed Begley†,◊
 Yul Brynner†
 Judi Dench◊
 Sandy Dennis†
 José Ferrer†,◊
 Henry Fonda†,◊
 Joel Grey◊
 Alec Guinness†◊
 Marcia Gay Harden◊
 Rex Harrison†
 Audrey Hepburn†
 Judy Holliday†
 Lila Kedrova†
 Kevin Kline◊
 Vivien Leigh†
 Fredric March†,◊
 Walter Matthau†,◊
 Liza Minnelli
 Paul Muni†,◊
 Patricia Neal†,◊
 Eddie Redmayne
 Anne Revere†
 Mercedes Ruehl
 Mark Rylance◊
 Kevin Spacey◊
 Beatrice Straight†,◊
 Jo Van Fleet†
 Denzel Washington
 Catherine Zeta-Jones

Missing an Academy Award (Oscar)

 Jane Alexander◊
 Mary Alice†
 Judith Anderson†,◊
 Bea Arthur†
 Christine Baranski
 Ellen Barkin
 Gertrude Berg†
 Philip Bosco †
 David Burns†
 Stockard Channing◊
 Kristin Chenoweth
 Glenn Close◊
 James Corden
 Bryan Cranston◊
 Hume Cronyn†,◊
 Billy Crudup
 Tyne Daly
 Blythe Danner
 André De Shields
 Colleen Dewhurst†
 Stephen Dillane
 Nanette Fabray†
 Laurence Fishburne◊
 Ed Flanders†
 Helen Gallagher
 Vincent Gardenia†,◊
 George Grizzard†
 Julie Harris†,◊
 Neil Patrick Harris
 Rosemary Harris◊
 George Hearn
 Edward Herrmann†
 Gregory Hines †
 Judd Hirsch◊
 Hal Holbrook †, ◊
 Ken Howard†
 Hugh Jackman◊
 Derek Jacobi
 Michael Jeter†
 Cherry Jones
 James Earl Jones◊ NCA
 Madeline Kahn †,◊
 Shirley Knight†,◊
 Richard Kiley†
 Swoosie Kurtz
 Nathan Lane
 Anthony LaPaglia
 John Larroquette
 Ron Leibman†
 Margaret Leighton†,◊
 Judith Light
 John Lithgow◊
 Cleavon Little†
 Mary Martin†
 Roddy McDowall†
 Laurie Metcalf◊
 Bette Midler◊
 Debra Monk
 Michael Moriarty
 Robert Morse†
 Donna Murphy
 Bebe Neuwirth
 Cynthia Nixon
 Mary-Louise Parker
 Mandy Patinkin
 David Hyde Pierce
 Amanda Plummer
 Billy Porter
 Diana Rigg†
 Tony Shalhoub
 Phil Silvers†
 Lily Tomlin◊
 Cicely Tyson †, ◊, NCA
 Dick Van Dyke
 Courtney B. Vance
 Eli Wallach †, NCA
 Jeffrey Wright

Missing a Tony Award

 Julie Andrews◊
 Patricia Arquette
 Kathy Bates◊
 Halle Berry
 Marlon Brando†
 Art Carney†,◊
 Olivia Colman
 Bette Davis†
 Laura Dern
 Michael Douglas
 Patty Duke†
 Faye Dunaway
 Robert Duvall
 Sally Field◊
 Jane Fonda◊
 John Gielgud †,◊,NCA
 Ruth Gordon†,◊
 Louis Gossett Jr.
 Lee Grant
 Anne Hathaway
 Eileen Heckart†,◊,NCA
 Katharine Hepburn†,◊
 Dustin Hoffman◊
 William Holden†
 Anthony Hopkins
 Helen Hunt
 Holly Hunter
 Allison Janney◊
 Nicole Kidman
 Regina King
 Cloris Leachman†
 Tommy Lee Jones
 Melissa Leo
 Jack Lemmon†,◊
 Karl Malden†
 Rami Malek
 Julianne Moore
 Paul Newman†,◊
 Lupita Nyong'o,◊
 Laurence Olivier†,◊
 Geraldine Page†,◊
 Jack Palance†
 Gwyneth Paltrow
 Cliff Robertson†
 Eva Marie Saint
 George C. Scott†,◊
 Simone Signoret†
 Meryl Streep◊
 Emma Thompson
 Claire Trevor†
 Peter Ustinov†,◊
 Dianne Wiest
 Robin Williams†
 Kate Winslet
 Shelley Winters†
 Joanne Woodward
 Loretta Young†

Notes
 † – Person is deceased.
 ◊ – Person has been nominated at least once for a competitive acting category of the missing award, but has failed to win.
 NCA – Person won a Non-Competitive Award in this category.

Won an Emmy in a non-acting category.
Nominated for an Emmy in a non-acting category.
Won a Daytime Emmy.
Won an International Emmy.
Won a Tony in a non-acting category.

Three nominations 
The following people have not won all three awards in competitive acting categories, but have received at least one nomination for each of them:

 Alan Alda
 Jane Alexander
 Joan Allen
 Judith Anderson†
 Julie Andrews
 Alan Arkin
 Lauren Bacall†
 Alec Baldwin
 Martin Balsam†
 Antonio BanderasN/A
 Barbara Barrie
 Kathy Bates
 Ed Begley†
 Ralph Bellamy†
 Annette BeningN/A
 Cate Blanchett
 Richard Burton†
 Diahann Carroll†
 Art Carney†
 Stockard Channing
 Don Cheadle
 Patricia Clarkson
 Glenn Close
 James Coco†
 Claudette Colbert†
 Toni Collette
 Chris Cooper
 Gladys Cooper†,N/A
 Tom CourtenayN/A
 Bryan Cranston
 Hume Cronyn†
 Judi Dench
 Adam DriverN/A
 Charles Durning†
 Cynthia Erivo
 José Ferrer†
 Sally Field
 Ralph Fiennes
 Albert Finney†
 Laurence Fishburne
 Henry Fonda†
 Jane Fonda
 Morgan Freeman
 Vincent Gardenia†
 Andrew Garfield
 John Gielgud†
 Jack Gilford†
 Jackie Gleason†
 Ruth Gordon†
 Joel Grey
 Alec Guinness†
 Tom Hanks
 Marcia Gay Harden
 Ed HarrisN/A
 Julie Harris†
 Rosemary Harris
 Eileen Heckart†
 Brian Tyree HenryN/A
 Katharine Hepburn†
 Judd Hirsch
 Dustin Hoffman
 Philip Seymour Hoffman†
 Hal Holbrook†
 Ian Holm†
 Tom Hulce
 William Hurt†
 Hugh Jackman
 Allison Janney
 James Earl Jones
 Madeline Kahn†
 Anna KendrickN/A
 Kevin Kline
 Shirley Knight†
 Angela Lansbury†
 Eva Le Gallienne†
 Margaret Leighton†
 Jack Lemmon†
 Laura Linney
 John Lithgow
 Walter Matthau†
 Ian McKellen
 Janet McTeer
 Laurie Metcalf
 Bette Midler
 Paul Muni†
 Mildred Natwick†
 Patricia Neal†
 Ruth NeggaN/A
 Kate NelliganN/A
 Paul Newman†
 Lupita Nyong'o
 Leslie Odom Jr.
 Sophie Okonedo
 Laurence Olivier†
 Geraldine Page†
 Joan Plowright
 Sidney Poitier+
 Jonathan Pryce
 Anthony Quayle+
 Anthony Quinn†
 Stephen ReaN/A
 Lynn Redgrave†,N/A
 Debbie Reynolds†,N/A
 Beah Richards†
 Thelma Ritter†
 Sam Rockwell
 Mickey Rooney†
 Mark Ruffalo
 Mark Rylance
 George C. Scott†
 Gary Sinise
 Kevin Spacey
 Kim Stanley†
 Beatrice Straight†
 Meryl Streep
 Lily Tomlin
 Rip Torn†
 Cicely Tyson†
 Stanley Tucci
 Peter Ustinov†
 Christopher Walken
 Sam WaterstonN/A
 Sigourney WeaverN/A
 James Whitmore†
 Michelle Williams
 Mare Winningham

Notes
 † – Person is deceased.
 N/A – Person has not won any of the three awards (excluding non-acting awards and non-competitive awards).

British Triple Crown 

The British entertainment industry has a Triple Crown of its own, consisting of the BAFTA Film Awards, the BAFTA Television Awards and the Laurence Olivier Awards. Eight actors have completed the British Triple Crown: Judi Dench, Virginia McKenna, Peggy Ashcroft, Nigel Hawthorne, Albert Finney, Julie Walters, Helen Mirren, and Mark Rylance. Only Mirren has completed both the American and British Triple Crowns.

Other actors have won all of the awards, but not in competitive acting categories. Anthony Hopkins has BAFTAs in both categories but only an Olivier Award for "Outstanding Achievement" (he was nominated as Best Actor for the same show, but lost).  Maggie Smith has several Film BAFTAs but only non-competitive awards for BAFTA Television and Olivier. There had been confusion about whether or not Ashcroft qualifies for the British Triple Crown in competitive categories because her winning the Actress of the Year in a New Play Olivier Award for Old World in the inaugural year of the Olivier Awards in 1976 had been overlooked.

Other winners include actors Alan Bennett and Kenneth Branagh, but some of their awards weren't for acting categories.

Summary

Judi Dench

English actress Judi Dench (born 1934) completed the triple crown in 1977, becoming the first person to complete the British triple crown. She completed her second triple crown in 1986, her third triple crown in 1988, and her fourth in 2001.  She is a 12-time BAFTA TV (4), 15-time BAFTA Film (6), and 15-time Olivier (7) nominee, for a total of 42 TC nominations. Dench has won seventeen awards.

 1965: BAFTA Award for Most Promising Newcomer to Leading Film Roles - Four in the Morning
 1968: British Academy Television Award for Best Actress - Talking to a Stranger
 1977: Laurence Olivier Award for Actress of the Year in a Revival - Macbeth
 1980: Laurence Olivier Award for Actress of the Year in a Revival - Juno and the Paycock
 1982: British Academy Television Award for Best Actress - Going Gently, A Fine Romance (Series 1), and The Cherry Orchard
 1983: Laurence Olivier Award for Actress of the Year in a New Play - Pack of Lies
 1985: British Academy Television Award for Best Entertainment Performance - A Fine Romance (Series 4)
 1986: BAFTA Award for Best Actress in a Supporting Role - A Room with a View
 1987: Laurence Olivier Award for Best Actress - Antony and Cleopatra
 1988: BAFTA Award for Best Actress in a Supporting Role - A Handful of Dust
 1996: Laurence Olivier Award for Best Actress - Absolute Hell
 1996: Laurence Olivier Award for Best Actress in a Musical - A Little Night Music
 1997: BAFTA Award for Best Actress in a Leading Role - Mrs Brown
 1998: BAFTA Award for Best Actress in a Supporting Role - Shakespeare in Love
 2001: British Academy Television Award for Best Actress - The Last of the Blonde Bombshells
 2001: BAFTA Award for Best Actress in a Leading Role - Iris
 2016: Laurence Olivier Award for Best Actress in a Supporting Role - The Winter's Tale

Dench is the only actor to complete multiple triple crowns of acting, on either the American or British side, and has completed four.  She is the only person to have won more than 7 triple crown awards, on either the British or American side.  She also holds the records (though tied) for most BAFTA TV nominations, most BAFTA Film nominations, and most BAFTA Film awards.

Dench has also won an Academy Award (1998 for Shakespeare in Love) and a Tony Award (1999 for Amy's View), but has yet to win an Emmy Award (after three nominations) to complete the American triple crown.

Virginia McKenna

British stage and screen actress, author, animal rights activist, and wildlife campaigner Virginia McKenna (born 1931) completed the triple crown in 1979. McKenna has won three awards.
 1955: British Academy Television Award for Best Actress
 1956: BAFTA Award for Best British Actress - A Town Like Alice
 1979: Laurence Olivier Award for Best Actress in a Musical - The King and I

Peggy Ashcroft

English actress Peggy Ashcroft (1907 - 1991) completed the triple crown in 1986. She won one competitive Olivier Award, two BAFTA TV Awards and one BAFTA Film Award. Ashcroft won four awards over a period of ten years. 
 1976: Laurence Olivier Award for Actress of the Year in a New Play - Old World
 1981: BAFTA Television Award for Best Actress - Cream in My Coffee/BBC2 Playhouse: Caught on a Train
 1985: BAFTA Television Award for Best Actress - The Jewel in the Crown
 1986: BAFTA Film Award for Best Actress - A Passage to India

Nigel Hawthorne
English actor Nigel Hawthorne (1929-2001) completed the triple crown in 1995. He is a 5-time BAFTA TV (5), 1-time BAFTA Film (1), and 2-time Olivier (1) nominee, for a total of 8 TC nominations. Hawthorne has won seven awards.
 1977: Laurence Olivier Award for Best Actor in a Supporting Role - Privates on Parade
 1982: British Academy Television Award for Best Entertainment Performance - Yes Minister
 1983: British Academy Television Award for Best Entertainment Performance - Yes Minister
 1987: British Academy Television Award for Best Entertainment Performance - Yes, Prime Minister
 1992: Laurence Olivier Award for Best Actor - The Madness of George III
 1995: BAFTA Award for Best Actor in a Leading Role - The Madness of King George
 1997: British Academy Television Award for Best Actor - The Fragile Heart
Hawthorne has also been nominated for an Academy Award (1995 for The Madness of King George) and won a Tony Award (1991 for Shadowlands), but he never won or was nominated for an Emmy Award.

Julie Walters

English actress Julie Walters (born 1950) completed the triple crown in 2002. She is a 7-time BAFTA TV (4), 6-time BAFTA Film (2), and 2-time Olivier (1) nominee, for a total of 11 TC nominations. Walters has won seven awards.  It took her eighteen years to complete the British Triple Crown.
 1984: BAFTA Award for Best Actress in a Leading Role – Educating Rita
 2000: BAFTA Award for Best Actress in a Supporting Role - Billy Elliot
 2001: Laurence Olivier Award for Best Actress – All My Sons
 2002: British Academy Television Award for Best Actress - My Beautiful Son
 2003: British Academy Television Award for Best Actress - Murder
 2004: British Academy Television Award for Best Actress - The Canterbury Tales
 2010: British Academy Television Award for Best Actress - Mo
Walters has also received an honorary BAFTA in 2003 and the BAFTA Academy Fellowship Award in 2014.  She received an Oscar nomination for Best Actress in 1984 for Educating Rita and a second nomination for Best Supporting Actress in 2001 for Billy Elliot. She is the recipient of two International Emmy Awards for Best Actress.

Albert Finney

English actor Albert Finney (1936-2019) completed the triple crown in 2003. He is a 4-time BAFTA TV (1), 9-time BAFTA Film (1), and 2-time Olivier (1) nominee, for a total of 15 TC nominations. Finney has won three awards.
 1960: BAFTA Award for Most Promising Newcomer - Saturday Night and Sunday Morning
 1986: Laurence Olivier Award for Best Actor - Orphans
 2003: British Academy Television Award for Best Actor - The Gathering Storm
Finney has also won an Emmy Award (2003 for The Gathering Storm) and two Tony Awards, but never won an Academy Award (after 5 nominations) to complete the American triple crown.

Helen Mirren

English actor Helen Mirren (born 1945) completed the triple crown in 2013. She is a 6-time BAFTA TV (3), 5-time BAFTA Film (1), and 4-time Olivier (1) nominee, for a total of 15 TC nominations. Mirren has won five awards.  It took her twenty-one years to complete the British Triple Crown.
 1991: British Academy Television Award for Best Actress – Prime Suspect: The Scent of Darkness
 1992: British Academy Television Award for Best Actress – Prime Suspect 2
 1993: British Academy Television Award for Best Actress – Prime Suspect 3
 2006: BAFTA Award for Best Actress in a Leading Role – The Queen
 2013: Laurence Olivier Award for Best Actress – The Audience
Helen Mirren is the only person to have also won the American Triple Crown of Acting by being awarded the three equivalent honors in the American entertainment industry: an Academy Award, a Primetime Emmy Award, and a Tony Award.

Mark Rylance

British actor, playwright and theatre director Mark Rylance (born 1960) completed the triple crown in 2015. He is a 2-time BAFTA TV (2), 1-time BAFTA Film (1), and 8-time Olivier (2) nominee, for a total of 11 TC nominations. Rylance has won five awards.
 1994: Laurence Olivier Award for Best Actor - Much Ado About Nothing
 2006: British Academy Television Award for Best Actor - The Government Inspector
 2010: Laurence Olivier Award for Best Actor - Jerusalem
 2015: BAFTA Award for Best Actor in a Supporting Role - Bridge of Spies
 2016: British Academy Television Award for Best Actor - Wolf Hall
Rylance has also won an Academy Award (2015 for Bridge of Spies) and three Tony Awards, but has yet to win an Emmy Award (after one nomination) to complete the American triple crown.

See also
 EGOT
 Academy Awards
 Emmy Awards
 Children's and Family Emmy Awards
 Daytime Emmy Awards
 International Emmy Awards
 Primetime Emmy Awards
 Tony Awards
 British Triple Crown (U.K.)

References